Cranley may refer to:

Places
 Cranley, Queensland, Australia, a suburb of Toowoomba
 Cranley, Suffolk, a location in England
 Cranley Gardens, London, England
 Cranleigh, a village in Surrey, England, formerly 'Cranley'

People
 Thomas Cranley (1337–1417), a statesman and cleric in Ireland
 John Cranley (MP) of Great Yarmouth (UK Parliament constituency) in 1419
 John Cranley (born 1974), mayor of Cincinnati, Ohio, United States
 Evan Cranley, a Canadian musician in various bands
 Baron Cranley, a past designation of the Earl of Onslow, a UK Peerage title